West Hibbard Township is a township in Kearny County, Kansas, USA.  As of the 2000 census, its population was 65.

Geography
West Hibbard Township covers an area of 155.37 square miles (402.42 square kilometers).

Adjacent townships
 Leoti Township, Wichita County (north)
 East Hibbard Township (east)
 Lakin Township (southeast)
 Hartland Township (south)
 Kendall Township, Hamilton County (southwest)
 Richland Township, Hamilton County (west)

References
 U.S. Board on Geographic Names (GNIS)
 United States Census Bureau cartographic boundary files

External links
 US-Counties.com
 City-Data.com

Townships in Kearny County, Kansas
Townships in Kansas